Hawaiian Paradise Park, also referred to as Paradise Park and known by many as HPP, is a census-designated place (CDP) in Hawaii County, Hawaii, United States, located in the District of Puna. The population was 11,404 at the 2010 census, up from 7,051 at the 2000 census. There are also numerous historic and archeological preservation sites in the subdivision, which include Native Hawaiian petroglyphs, heiau, and burial sites.

Geography
Hawaiian Paradise Park is located on the eastern side of the island of Hawaii at  (19.590388, -154.975734). It is bordered to the northeast by the Pacific Ocean, to the southeast by Hawaiian Beaches, and to the southwest by Orchidlands Estates and Ainaloa. Hawaii Route 130 runs along the southwest edge of the CDP, leading northwest  to Keaau.

Demographics

As of the census of 2010, there were 11,404 people in 3,892 households residing in the CDP. The racial makeup of the CDP was 34.71% White, 0.78% African American, 0.61% American Indian & Alaska Native, 18.84% Asian, 11.76% Native Hawaiian & Pacific Islander, 1.05% from other races, and 32.26% from two or more races. Hispanic or Latino of any race were 14.89% of the population.

There were 3,892 households, out of which 33.0% had children under the age of 18 living with them.  The average household size was 2.93.

In the CDP the population was spread out, with 27.4% under the age of 18, 8.1% from 18 to 24, 12.7% from 25 to 34, 18.9% from 35 to 49, 22.4% from 50 to 64, and 10.5% who were 65 years of age or older.  For every 100 females, there were 102.1 males.  For every 100 males there were 98.0 females.

The median income for a household in the CDP at the 2000 census was $36,300, and the median income for a family in 2000 was $38,312. Males had a median income of $35,450 versus $23,642 for females in 2000. The per capita income for the CDP in 2000 was $15,417.  About 17.0% of families and 19.6% of the population were below the poverty line in 2000, including 28.1% of those under age 18 and 7.6% of those age 65 or over.

Hawaii Paradise Park Association
The original board meeting took place on 21 January 2009. 
The most recent board meeting took place 16 January 2019. Applications for the available vacant positions on the HPP board and also for the positions that will be expiring, are now being accepted at the HPP main office. Home and property owners in HPP that are current on their road maintenance fees are encouraged to apply. Visit Hppoa.net for more information, applications, and directions to the office.

Current Board of Directors:

District 1 – Larry Kawaauhau (President)
District 2 – Tanya Seaver
District 3 – Benjamin Foster
District 4 – Kenneth Helgren (Secretary)
District 5 – Emma Hoglund
District 6 – Craig Crelly (Vice President)
District 7 – Corky Schoomaker
District 8 – Vacant (Treasurer)
District 9 – Jeff Finley

References

Census-designated places in Hawaii County, Hawaii
Populated places on Hawaii (island)
Populated coastal places in Hawaii